The Ribnica Lodge is the highest mountain lodge in the Pohorje Mountains (northeastern Slovenia). It lies on a small plateau below Little Black Peak (Mali črni vrh) in the central area of the Pohorje Hills. The lodge is open all year round. It is accessible by car from Ribnica na Pohorju. There is also a small ski resort with three surface lifts.

History
At the time of former Yugoslavia, a lodge was built at the site by the Maribor merchant Josip Hutter. It was burned down by members of the Partisans' Pohorje Battalion on October 8, 1942. In 1949, hikers opened a new lodge at the same site.

Starting points
1½h from the Grmovšek Lodge
3¼h from the Pesek Lodge (via the Lakes Lovrenc
2h from Ribnica na Pohorju – walking trail
3h from Planja Hotel (via Lakes Lovrenc)
3h Ribnica na Pohorju – by road

See also
 Slovenian Mountain Hiking Trail

References

 Slovenska planinska pot, Planinski vodnik, PZS, 2012, Milenko Arnejšek - Prle, Andraž Poljanec

External links
 Routes, Description & Photos

Mountain huts in Slovenia
Pohorje